Belagavi Dakshin Assembly seat (also called Belgaum South) came into existence in 2008, when electoral map of India was redrawn. It is a part of Belagavi (Lok Sabha constituency) in the Indian state of Karnataka.

Assembly members 
 2008: Abhay Patil, Bharatiya Janata Party
 2013: Sambhaji Patil, Independent

Election results

2018 Election

2013

References

Assembly constituencies of Karnataka
Belagavi district